Mapusa municipal council is the municipality of Mapusa, the main commercial town in North Goa, located in the Bardez taluka.

Location
The municipality office and premises was till recently based at Feira Alta, on the slope going up to the Altinho locality of Mapusa. It has now been shifted to the renovated old school premises where the St Mary's Convent previously functioned.

External links
Mapusa Municipal Council official website

References

Mapusa
Municipalities of India